"Red Screen" is a short story by Stephen King, first published as an ebook by Humble Bundle in September 2021.

Plot summary 
The story begins with New York City Police Department detective Frank Wilson preparing for work. While he does, he is chided by his wife Sandi for various mistakes such as leaving the toilet seat up. Wilson reflects that Sandi has been more critical over the past six to eight months, and wonders whether she has changed or he has become more forgetful.

While driving to work, Wilson is diverted to a crime scene on 34th Avenue in Queens. Several hours later, Wilson interrogates Leonard Crocker, a plumber who has confessed to stabbing his wife Arlene to death. Crocker claims that he did not kill his wife, but rather an alien being who had stolen Arlene's body one year prior, killing her in the process. Crocker claims that Arlene was taken over by one of the frontrunners of an invasion force of "pure mind" aliens that will eventually number in the millions, telling Wilson that he learned about the invasion on the dark web.

As Wilson - believing Crocker intends to mount an insanity defense - attempts to end the interview, Crocker claims that the personalities of people taken over by the aliens change to become more irritable and critical as a means of wearing down victims, enabling them to be taken over by other aliens. Before Wilson concludes the interview, Crocker makes an oblique references to seeing a "red screen".

Upon arriving home that evening, Wilson is again chided by Sandi. While eating a reheated dinner, Wilson receives a phone call from his captain, who informs him that Crocker killed himself by stabbing himself in the jugular vein while in intake at the Metropolitan Detention Center. Following the call, Sandi comforts Wilson by cooking him a fresh meal, and later that night they have sex for the first time in several weeks. After Sandi states that she needs to tell Wilson something, he suspects that she will ask for a divorce, but instead she tells him that her irritable behavior over the last few months has been due to premature menopause. As the couple prepare to go to sleep, the screen of Wilson's cell phone momentarily flashes red, and Sandi smiles in the dark.

Publication
"Red Screen" was originally published as a limited edition ebook by Humble Bundle in September 2021. The proceeds from sales of the story were donated to the American Civil Liberties Union, a charity selected by King. The story was originally released on a "pay what you want" basis (with a minimum price of $5 USD).

References

See also
 Stephen King short fiction bibliography

External links
 "Red Screen" at HumbleBundle.com

2021 short stories
Horror short stories
Humble Bundle
Science fiction short stories
Short stories by Stephen King
Short stories set in New York City